Jean Charles Mattei (born  in Reims) is a French short-track speed-skater.

Mattei competed at the 2006 and 2010 Winter Olympics for France. In 2006, he finished third in his opening heat of the 1000 metres and fifth in his opening heat of the 1500 metres, failing to advance in both. In the 2010 Olympics,  he finished fifth in his opening race of the  1500 metres, but was advanced to the semifinals, where he finished seventh, failing to advance.. He was also part of the French 5000 metre relay team, which placed third in the semifinal, but was advanced to the final, where they finished 5th.

As of 2013, Mattei's best performance at the World Championships came as part of the French relay team in 2004, which finished 6th. His best individual performance also came in 2004, in the 1000 metres. He also won a silver medal as a member of the French relay team at the 2006 European Championships.

As of 2013, Mattei has one ISU Short Track Speed Skating World Cup podium finish, a bronze as part of the relay team in 2006-2007 at Heerenveen. His top World Cup ranking is 13th, in the 1500 metres in 2003–04.

World Cup Podiums

References 

1988 births
Living people
French male short track speed skaters
Olympic short track speed skaters of France
Short track speed skaters at the 2006 Winter Olympics
Short track speed skaters at the 2010 Winter Olympics
Sportspeople from Reims
21st-century French people